The European Project for Ice Coring in Antarctica (EPICA) is a multinational European project for deep ice core drilling in Antarctica.  Its main objective is to obtain full documentation of the climatic and atmospheric record archived in Antarctic ice by drilling and analyzing two ice cores and comparing these with their Greenland counterparts (GRIP and GISP). Evaluation of these records will provide information about the natural climate variability and mechanisms of rapid climatic changes during the last glacial epoch.

The European Science Foundation EPICA Programme (1996–2005) provides co-ordination for EPICA drilling activities at Dome Concordia and Kohnen Station, which are supported by the European Commission and by national contributions from Belgium, Denmark, France, Germany, Italy, the Netherlands, Norway, Sweden, Switzerland and the United Kingdom.

Deep drilling took place at two sites in Antarctica: Concordia Station at Dome C and Kohnen Station.

In 2008 the project received the Descartes Prize for Research.

Concordia Station at Dome C

This site (3233 m above sea level, 560 km from Vostok Station) was chosen to obtain the longest undisturbed chronicle of environmental change, in order to characterise climate variability over several glacial cycles, and to study potential climate forcings and their relationship to events in other regions.  The core goes back 740,000 years and reveals 8 previous glacial cycles. Drilling was completed at this site in December 2004, reaching a drilling depth of 3270.2 m, 5 m above bedrock. Present-day annual average air temperature is −54.5 °C and snow accumulation 25 mm/y. Information about the core was first published in Nature on 10 June 2004.

The picture shows delta deuterium data (a proxy for temperature: more negative values indicate lower temperatures) from both EPICA and Vostok.  The upper plot, with x-axis being age (years before 1950) clearly shows the extra information in the EPICA core before the start of the Vostok record. The lower picture, plotted against depth, shows how compressed the deeper parts of the cores are: the earliest 100 kyr (thousand years) of the EPICA core are in the bottom 100 m of the core.

Before 400 kyr the character of the ice ages are seen to be somewhat different: interglacial warmth is distinctly less warm than the four most recent interglacials; however, the interglacial periods before 400 kyr occupied a much larger proportion of each cycle than subsequently. The interglacial 400 kyr ago, which is believed (from arguments about the configuration of the orbital parameters of the earth) to be an approximate analogue to the current interglacial, was quite long: 28 kyr. The Nature paper argues that if this analogue is accepted, then the current climate would be expected to continue like today's, in the absence of human influence (which it states is unlikely, given the predicted increases in greenhouse gas concentrations).

Further analysis of the core is hoped to extend the record back somewhat further, possibly as far as the Brunhes–Matuyama magnetic reversal, believed to be at about 780 kyr.

The core time scale is derived from the measured depth scale by a model incorporating surface snow accumulation variations, ice thinning, basal heat fluxes, etc., and is empirically "tied" at 4 times by matches to the marine isotopic record.

Kohnen Station, Dronning Maud Land
Higher annual snowfall and sensitivity to conditions over the South Atlantic will allow the study of any links between shifts in the Atlantic Ocean circulation and the rapid climate events detected over Greenland.

Beyond EPICA – Oldest Ice
The European project "Beyond EPICA – Oldest Ice" aims at obtaining older ice cores, which are expected to provide climatic data up to 1.5 million years old.  A drill site, "Little Dome C", was chosen in 2022 and drilling operations will take place in the following years.

See also

 Dome C
 Concordia Station
 Vostok Station
 Kohnen Station
 Dome F
 Jean Robert Petit
 Ice core

References

External links
 EPICA page of the European Science Foundation
 as PDF
 Kohnen Station home page
 EPICA Press Release announcing the successful completion of ice core drilling at Dome C
Coverage by the BBC
 COMNAP Antarctic Facilities
 COMNAP Antarctic Facilities Map

 
Geochronological institutions and organizations
Europe and the Antarctic